Marian Cârjă  (born 3 May 1987) is a Romanian footballer.

External links
 

1987 births
Living people
Sportspeople from Galați
Romanian footballers
Association football defenders
Liga I players
Liga II players
ASC Oțelul Galați players
FC Petrolul Ploiești players
FC Delta Dobrogea Tulcea players
CS Universitatea Craiova players